The Philippine Basketball League awards a championship trophy (or cup) to the winning team at the end of each tournament.

Champions by season

Champions by franchise

Notes:
The original Magnolia franchise disbanded after the 1995-96 season. The second incarnation of Magnolia thru Viva Mineral Water, which joined the league in 2003, won two championships under coach Koy Banal. Their title victory in 2004 was referred as "first". 
For some reason, the Otto Shoes ballclub's roots was traced to Sta.Lucia,  but the Realtors was considered a different team from the ESQ Merchants, whom they completely took over at the start of the 1987 PABL season. 
Ateneo-Hapee's title victory was not counted to that of Hapee Toothpaste' three championships.

Most Valuable Players

 No MVP was awarded during this conference only a Finals MVP for this conference. League started to name season MVP in the 2007-08 season. In 2008-09 season, the league handed out awards for the Best Player of the Conference, similar to the Philippine Basketball Association.

Season Most Valuable Players

Best Player of the Conference

Finals Most Valuable Players

Champions by coach

PABL / PBL coaches with one championship: 

Ron Jacobs (De La Salle) 
Loreto Carbonell (Arellano University) 
Nemie Villegas (Bank of Rizal)
Chuck Barreiro (ESQ) 
Carlos Badion (Army) 
Alfredo Enriquez (Lhuillier) 
Arturo Valenzona (Swift) 
Fortunato Co, Jr (Crispa) 
Bogs Adornado (Crispa) 
Orly Castelo (Nikon)

Perry Ronquillo (Burger Machine)
Willie Generalao (Casino)
Jimmy Mariano (Agfa)
Leo Isaac (Dr. J/ANA Water Dispenser)
Joel Banal (Ateneo-Hapee-Nenaco)
Robert Sison (Montaña)
Caloy Garcia (Welcoat)
Glenn Capacio (Oracle)
Ato Agustin (Excel Roof)

References

External links
Gameface.ph: PBL/PABL Champions past & present

Philippine Basketball League